Marinduque, officially the Province of Marinduque, is an island province in the Philippines located in Southwestern Tagalog Region or Mimaropa, formerly designated as Region IV-B. Its capital is the municipality of Boac. Marinduque lies between Tayabas Bay to the north and Sibuyan Sea to the south. It is west of the Bondoc Peninsula of Quezon province; east of Mindoro Island; and north of the island province of Romblon. Some parts of the Verde Island Passage, the center of the center of world's marine biodiversity and a protected marine area, are also within Marinduque's provincial waters.

The province of Marinduque was ranked number 1 by the Philippine National Police and Philippine Security Forces as the 2013 Most Peaceful Province of the country due to its low crime rate statistics alternately ranking with the province of Batanes yearly. Furthermore, for almost 200 years, the province is home to one of the oldest religious festivals of the country, the Moriones celebrated annually every Holy Week.

History
The most accepted theory of the etymology of the province's name is a Hispanized corruption of either malindig or malindug, which means "stand tall" or "elegant", in reference to a potentially active volcano in the southern section of the island, the Mount Malindig. Domingo Navarette ('Tratados...', 1676) wrote "The island which the natives call Minolo is named Mindoro by the Spaniards, and that of Malindic we call Marinduque." (trans. by Blair and Robertson).

During the Spanish and early American occupations, Marinduque was part of Balayan Province (now Batangas) in the 16th century, Mindoro from the 17th to 19th century, and had a brief period as an independent province from the time the Americans arrived in 1901 to 1902.

In 1571, Governor-General Miguel López de Legaspi assigned the then-encomienda of Marinduque to a certain Fr. Pedro de Herrera, the first Augustinian priest who introduced Christianity to the natives of the island.

During the Philippine–American War, Marinduque was the first island to have American concentration camps. Marinduque is the site of the Battle of Pulang Lupa, where 250 Filipino soldiers under Colonel Maximo Abad, defeated a smaller force of 54 American Infantrymen. It is one of the few battles during the pacification of the Philippines where the tenacity and bravery of the Filipinos prevailed over the well-armed Americans. Col. Abad after capturing the Americans later surrendered on April 15, 1901, upon orders from Gen. Emilio Aguinaldo and due to the capture of Gov. Martin Lardizabal and two other officials of the revolutionary who were held hostage by the Americans in Fort Santiago.

On June 23, 1902, by virtue of Act No. 423, the US-Philippine Commission annexed the islands of Mindoro (now two separate provinces) and Lubang (now part of Occidental Mindoro) to the province. Four months later, on November 10, Marinduque was annexed to the province of Tayabas (now Quezon) by virtue of an Act No. 499.

On February 21, 1920, Act No. 2280 was passed by the Philippine Congress, reestablishing Marinduque as a separate province.

In 1942, during the Second World War, the Japanese Imperial forces landed in Marinduque.

In 1945, combined American and Filipino troops liberated the province from the Japanese forces. Two government agencies were stationed in the province during the American period, the Philippine Commonwealth Army and the Philippine Constabulary. The general headquarters of the PCA was active from 1935 to 1942 and again from 1945 to 1946 while the PC was active from 1945 to 1946.

Archaeological finds
Archaeology in the Philippines began in Marinduque. Prior to 1900, only one important archaeological investigation had been carried out in the country: the Antoine-Alfred Marche’s exploration of Marinduque from April to July 1881. According to anthropologist Henry Otley Beyer, while many other accidental discoveries and finds have been recorded from time to time and a few burial caves and sites had been casually explored by European and local scientists, no systematic work had been done anywhere else prior to these explorations. After Marche, the next important archaeological work was undertaken by Dr. Carl Gunthe in the Visayas Island Group in 1922.

An abundant yield of Chinese urns, vases, gold ornaments, skulls, and other ornaments of pre-colonial origin was what Marche finds represented. He brought back to France the Marinduque artifacts he uncovered in 40 crates. Part of it now is said to be housed at the Musée de l'Homme in France. The finds also included a wooden image of the Marinduque anito called "Pastores" by the natives.

One of these artifacts also found its way into the National Museum of Natural History of the Smithsonian Institution in Washington, D.C. (Catalogue No. A127996-0, Department of Anthropology, NMNH, Smithsonian Institution). These fragile jarlets traveled from China to the pre-colonial Philippines. Buried in a cave in Marinduque for centuries, excavated in the late 19th century, brought to Paris and eventually one ended up at the Smithsonian Institution museum.

Part of Marinduque's history lies at the Marinduque Museum in Poblacion at Boac and in museums abroad. It will take some time to analyze these artifacts to piece together its pre-colonial past.

Geography

Marinduque is considered as the geographical center of the Philippine archipelago by the Luzon Datum of 1911, the mother of all Philippine geodetic surveys. It is separated from the Bondoc Peninsula in Quezon by the Mompong Pass. West of Marinduque is Tablas Strait, which separates it from Mindoro Island.

Some of the smaller islands to the northeast are Polo Island, Maniwaya Island, and Mompong Island. Southwest portion includes the Tres Reyes Islands and Elephant Island.

Cave Systems

Various cave systems occupy the province, including:
 Bathala Cave located near Barangay Ipil in Sta. Cruz town; 
 Tarug Caves located at Barangay Tarug, in the town of Mogpog, a three-chambered caves of limestone formation. It rises steeply to 270 feet above the ground and is located 331 ft above sea level. Pinnacle is barely 3 square meters.
 Bagumbungan Cave, a cave system in San Isidro and Punong with complex subterranean river
 Talao Caves, a 12 series of caves overlooking the western part of the island.

Climate
Marinduque has a Type III climate, having rainfall more or less evenly distributed throughout the year with no clear boundary between dry and wet seasons. Humidity average is 78% year-round with an average annual rainfall totaling .

Administrative divisions
Marinduque comprises 6 municipalities, further subdivided into 218 barangays. A double legislative districts encompasses all towns.

Boac The capital of the province. The most populous town in the province Boac remains the center of industry, culture, economy, and education. Most government and private offices are in the municipality of Boac. It also borders all five municipalities. Mogpog to the North, Santa Cruz to the Northeast, Torrijos to the East, Buenavista to the South, and Gasan to the Southwest. Boac is named after the Tagalog word, which means divided, due to the Boac River dividing the town in the geographic north and south.

Gasan The Cultural Nerve Center of the province. Dubbed as one of the cleanest and greenest municipalities in the Philippines, Gasan's land area covers a forest reserve in the eastern part. It is also the gateway to the island of Mindoro. Handicrafts and the famous Kalutang boasts from the town of Gasan. It was named after , a local term for corals found in the municipality.

Buenavista The smallest of the six municipalities. It was once part of the municipality of Gasan known as Sabang. It was named such because of the "good view" of the Tablas Strait and offshore islands.

Torrijos Named after three purported origins; 1) from Gen. Torrijos, 2) from torrillos, referring to the cows which pastured in its vast plains, and 3) from torre y hijos, referring to the watchtower men guarding the parish. Torrijos is deemed to be the summer capital of the Province and known for locally-grown strawberries.

Santa Cruz The largest of all the six municipalities in terms of land area and the second most populous town after Boac . It is considered as a secondary municipality after Boac (since it is the capital). Together with Boac, it is also a first-class municipality with established industries and commercial routines.

Mogpog The Primary Gateway of the Province through the Balanacan Port. It is the original home of the Moriones Lenten Rites and Kangga Festiva. Mogpog was named after the Tagalog word,  or kiln makers abundant in the municipality.

Demographics

Religion
Marinduque is resided by various religious groups, with Catholics belonging to the Latin Rite predominantly making up the greatest number with 70%. The Iglesia Filipina Independiente has 25% of the population  and the rest belongs to the different denominations such as the Church of Jesus Christ of Latter-day Saints, Iglesia ni Cristo, and various Mainline Protestant denominations which include Assemblies of God, Baptists, JIL, Methodists, Presbyterian, Seventh-day Adventist Church (SDA), and the non-denominational Evangelical churches also known as Born-Again Christians. Muslims, Anitists, animists, and atheists are also present in the province.

Language
The version of Tagalog spoken in Marinduque, known as the Marinduque Tagalog, has been described as "the root from which modern national forms of speech have sprung," where remnants of archaic Tagalog could be found, spoken in a lilting manner by its inhabitants. If this linguistic theory is accurate, Marinduque's Tagalog has contributed significantly to the development of the official Philippine national language.

To this day, Marinduqueños speak an old variation of the Tagalog language that is very close to the way Tagalog was spoken before the Spanish colonization. According to language experts , the Tagalog dialects of Marinduque are the most divergent, especially the Eastern Marinduque dialect, perhaps due to the relative isolation from the Tagalogs of Luzon and also perhaps due to the influence of the Visayan and Bikol migrants. Many educated Marinduqueños speak version of Tagalog during Spanish colonial era and with English terms, closer to modern Filipino or standard Tagalog, because of mass media and modern versions of Tagalog Bible, and retaining Visayan and Bikol influence.

Linguist Rosa Soberano's 1980 The Dialects of Marinduque Tagalog goes into great depth concerning the dialects spoken there. The following is a verb chart which outlines the conjugation of the Eastern Marinduque dialect of Tagalog:

Linguist Christopher Sundita observed that some of the affixes in Marinduque Tagalog, particularly "a-" and "ina-," are affixes used in Asi (Bantoanon), a Visaya language spoken in Romblon, just south of Marinduque. Marinduque Tagalog, like the Tagalog spoken over two centuries ago, had an additional verb category, the imperative, which was used for commands and requests (e.g., Matulog ka na - Go to sleep). Even then, the imperative and the infinitive were used side by side in expressing commands; but in standard Tagalog, apparently the infinitive became used exclusively. And in the Eastern Marinduque dialect, the imperative affixes are very much alive.

Economy

Marinduque is an agricultural province, primarily growing rice and coconuts. Handicrafts from Marinduque are also exported to dıfferent parts of the world, and fishing is another important part of the economy. Mining was once an important player in the economy until a mining accident (the Marcopper Mining Disaster) occurred, bringing the industry to a standstill on the island and causing enormous damage to the inhabitants. The provincial government has just recently sued Marcopper's parent company, Placer Dome, for $100 million in damages. Placer Dome was purchased in 2006 by Barrick Gold, who has now been joined in the lawsuit.

A significant role in Marinduque's economy is also played by tourism, especially during the Lenten season. While this is not one of the larger parts of the island's economy, it has shown great growth. Recently, some residents are now engaged in butterfly farming. Butterflies are raised for export to countries in both Europe and the Americas. Locally, live butterflies are released in celebration on different occasions, such as birthdays, weddings, and some corporate events.

Culture

Festivals 
The Moriones Festival is an annual festival, locally known as "Moryonan", celebrated in Marinduque from March to April. In Santa Cruz, Gasan, Boac, and Mogpog, a parade of people dressed as "Moryons" can be seen on the main road connecting the towns of the island. Boac and Santa Cruz, the biggest towns in the province, shows a reenactment in the evening of the actual event when Longinus, a blind soldier, punctures Jesus with his spear and blood droplets from the wound restores Longinus's sight.

Music 
Marinduque is home to the kalutang, a musical instrument made of two pieces of wood that produce different note ranges depending on its size. A band of 10 to 12 can create music with this instrument. In 2011, the kalutang instrument was cited by the National Commission for Culture and the Arts as one of the intangible cultural heritage of the Philippines under the traditional craftsmanship category that the government may nominate in the UNESCO Intangible Cultural Heritage Lists.

Government

Marinduque has had its own Governor since becoming a sub-province of Tayabas (now Quezon) in 1902 and after gaining its independence from Tayabas in 1920.

Transport

Marinduque is served by direct Cebu Pacific flights to-and-from Manila and Marinduque Airport which is located in Masiga, roughly between Gasan and Boac. The province is also served by a seaport in Balanacan transporting cargo and passengers to and from Lucena in Quezon province. There is also a daily boat trip from General Luna in Quezon province to Santa Cruz and vice versa which stops at Maniwaya Island to drop off cargo and passengers.

Media
There are four radio stations in the province, three of which are operated by the Radyo Natin Network and the other, FM Nutriskwela Community Radio Station Radyo Kamalindig 94.1 DZNS, by the National Nutrition Council. Radyo Natin Network operates the call sign DZVH at 105.7 MHz on FM radio from Boac, as well as the call sign DWMD 104.5 MHz on FM radio from Santa Cruz and 100.1 FM from Torrijos. As for print media, there is no existing newspapers circulating in the province, aside from broadsheet and tabloid newspapers from Manila. Marinduque News Network, meanwhile, provides provincial and national news and information via the web and social media. In 2018, Marinduque News Network ventured with Lucky Seven Cable Services Corporation, a cable provider in Marinduque to showcase their programs through local cable television. The online news website which was founded by Romeo Mataac, Jr. in 2016 is located in Boac, Marinduque.

There are also existing cable providers and local cable stations operating in several municipalities in the province, namely Lucky Seven Cable Services Corporation (Boac), Marinduque Cable Television, Inc. (Boac), and G.R. CATV Services (Santa Cruz & Torrijos). Aside from these cable stations, there are also distributors of direct-to-home (DTH) satellite TV such as Cignal Digital TV, Dream Satellite TV, G Sat, and Sky Direct who provide television services for its subscribers.

Education

Tertiary 

 Buyabod School of Arts and Trades (BSAT) — Buyabod, Santa Cruz
 Educational Systems Technological Institute (ESTI) — Murallon, Boac
 Lighthouse Maritime Schools, Inc. (LMSI) — Boac
 Malindig Institute (MI) — Lapu-Lapu, Santa Cruz
 Marinduque Midwest College (MMC) — Dili, Gasan
 Marinduque State University (MSU) — College of Agriculture in Poctoy, Torrijos
 Marinduque State University (MSU) — College of Fisheries in Banuyo, Gasan
 Marinduque State University  (MSU) — Main College Campus in Tanza, Boac
 Marinduque State University (MSU) — Marinduque Community University in Matalaba, Santa Cruz
 Marinduque State University (MSU) — Santa Cruz Annex, Santa Cruz
 Marinduque Victorian University (MVU) — Buenavista
 Saint Mary's College of Boac (SMCB) — Isok, Boac
 Santa Cruz Institute (SCI) — Banahaw, Santa Cruz
 Torrijos Poblacion School of Arts and Trades (TPSAT) — Poctoy, Torrijos

References

 Moriones Festival at travelingmorion.com

External links

 
 
 
 Total Population by Province, City, Municipality and Barangay as of August 1, 2007

 
Provinces of the Philippines
Island provinces of the Philippines
States and territories established in 1920
1920 establishments in the Philippines
Former sub-provinces of the Philippines
Provinces of Mimaropa